The oak toad (Anaxyrus quercicus) is a species of toad in the family Bufonidae. It is endemic to the coastal regions of southeastern United States.

Description 
The oak toad can be identified by its light mid-dorsal stripe, variable brown and black spots, and proportionally large parotoid glands. One of the most remarkable features of this species is its small adult size relative to other toads.  The male can be distinguished from the female by his clear white belly and a slightly distended, loose flap of skin beneath the mouth, which expands into the vocal sac. The female has a dark-spotted belly and lacks a vocal sac.

Habitat and distribution
The oak toad is native to the coastal regions of the southeastern United States, ranging from eastern Louisiana to southeast Virginia and south throughout Florida. It is found in a variety of habitats, including sandy pine flatwoods and oak scrub, open pine and pine-oak woods, pine or oak savanna with sandy soils, and maritime forests. Oak toads prefer open-canopied pine flatwoods with grassy ground cover, and they are generally found in moist, grassy areas near pine or oak savannahs with sandy soil. They are also found in vernal pools and freshwater wetlands.

Behavior 
It is mostly diurnal and spends much of its time burrowed into the loose soil of its habitat. It may remain in its burrow during the winter, often in hibernation. Breeding takes place in shallow pools that accumulate during heavy rains. The male expands his distinctive elongated vocal sac to produce a chirping call. The breeding season extends from April to October, peaking early on. Heavy, warm spring rains stimulate mating behavior. 

An average of 300–500 eggs are laid in short strands of 3 to 8 eggs each, with each egg about a millimeter wide. The strands are attached to vegetation, usually submerged blades of grass  beneath the surface. Energy investment in producing this quantity of eggs is significant, and many females are found dead during the mating season due to the rigors of the process. Fertilization takes place externally, with sperm being released in the vicinity of the eggs. As with other species of toad, the male oak toad has a Bidder's organ, which can become a functional ovary in the event of testicular malfunction.

Diet
The oak toad is a small, terrestrial frog that feeds on a variety of insects and other small invertebrates. Its diet consists primarily of ants, beetles, and spiders, as well as other insects and arthropods. The oak toad spends much of its time foraging for food, using its long, sticky tongue to capture prey. The oak toad eats mainly small insects and other arthropods. The adult has a strong preference for ants.

Life cycle
Eggs develop quickly, hatching in a mere 24 to 36 hours. It is grayish olive or grape-green dorsally and purplish ventrally. The tail has 6 or 7 black saddle marks. The tadpole completes metamorphosis into a juvenile toadlet in 4 to 6 weeks, and it reaches adulthood and sexual maturity at 1.5 to 2.3 years of age.
The length of the lifespan is unclear. There are records of specimens living for four years in captivity, and the reported average lifespan in captivity is 1.9 years.

Predation 
The primary predators of the oak toad are snakes, particularly hognosed snakes, which are specialized for eating toads. Other predators include garter snakes and gopher frogs.
As with many bufonids, the oak toad inflates its body in unkenreflex when confronted by a potential predator. It secretes toxins from its parotoid glands and urinates when threatened. The male may chirp as a response to predators. Eggs also appear to have some toxic properties.

References

Further reading
 Anaxyrus quercicus. AmphibiaWeb.

Anaxyrus
Fauna of the Southeastern United States
Amphibians of the United States
Endemic fauna of the United States
Amphibians described in 1840
Taxa named by John Edwards Holbrook
Taxonomy articles created by Polbot